The International Recording Media Association (IRMA), previously known as the International Tape Association (ITA), was an international trade association dealing with every facet of recording, media and related industries. Their membership includes raw material providers, manufacturers, replicators, duplicators, packagers, copyright holders, and others.

Founded in 1970 by media pioneer Larry Finley, IRMA today counts such recording media giants as Sony, Panasonic, JVC, BMG, Universal, Fuji, Eastman Kodak, Warner, and EMI among its member companies.

According to their official website:

IRMA has been around more than 30 years. Beginning with the introduction of the audiocassette, through the home video revolution, and right up to the current digital and electronic delivery era, IRMA has always been the organization companies have turned to for news, networking, market research, information services, and leadership."

With the advent of digital delivery IRMA evolved into the CDSA, the Content Delivery & Security Association.  Their aim IP protection.  The CDSA merged with the MESA (Media & Entertainment Services Alliance) by bringing additional aspects of digital delivery, fulfilment and distribution in a single organization.

References

External links
International Recording Media Association official website
Content Delivery & Security Association IRMA rehashed 
Media & Entertainment Services Alliance

Music industry